"Che sarà" ("What [it] will be") is an Italian song, written by Jimmy Fontana (music) and Franco Migliacci (lyrics) for the 1971 Sanremo Music Festival. Up until that year, each song was interpreted by two artists or performers to showcase the songwriters craft rather than the singers interpretations.

"Che sarà" was sung by José Feliciano and the Ricchi e Poveri group and came second to "Il cuore è uno zingaro". RCA's Italian producers saw the song and the festival as a way to bring José Feliciano, already an international star, to Italy, as he already knew Jimmy Fontana. Although Ricchi e Poveri was a new, young group, it was chosen to sing the second version after Gianni Morandi, a well known Italian singer and RCA artist, had declined to sing the song. Jimmy Fontana, reportedly, was disappointed by RCA's decision and withdrew from the music business for many years.

Recordings
Feliciano's recorded version was successful in Italy, in Central and Eastern Europe, the Middle East and Japan. It was an even greater success in Latin America and Spain in Feliciano's Spanish version, titled "Qué será". Feliciano's version peaked at number one in Spain. An English-language version titled Shake A Hand charted in Scandinavia but not in the Top Tens of the US or the UK.

The song is featured in the classic Bulgarian film from 1982, A Nameless Band. In the particular scene the singer Reni (played by Katerina Evro) announces "Che sarà" as "a song for love, parting, and something more."

In 2021 Ricchi e Poveri recorded the song with José Feliciano for the album ReuniON (DM Produzioni, 19439875041), also released in Russia.

Song
The lyrics of the song describe the singer's sadness at having to leave his native village ("Oh my village set on the hill, lying down like an old sleeping man") and were inspired by Cortona, a small town in Tuscany where the lyricist, Franco Migliacci, had lived for many years. For Jimmy Fontana, who wrote the music, the song is devoted to Bernalda, his wife's home village.

Coincidentally, the Cortona story echoes the personal history of José Feliciano, who was born in the hill village of Lares in Puerto Rico, and who left it for New York, joining many other Puerto Rican migrants to the US. In fact, the Spanish version of the song is considered by many in the Latino population to be a "migrants' hymn".

Chart positions

Foreign-language versions

References

José Feliciano songs
Italian-language songs
Number-one singles in Spain
Sanremo Music Festival songs
Songs with lyrics by Franco Migliacci
1971 songs
Songs written by Jimmy Fontana
Ricchi e Poveri songs